Ellis B. Levin (born April 10, 1945) is a politician who served two nonconsecutive tenures (1977-1979 and 1981-1995) as a Democratic member of the Illinois House of Representatives.

Biography
Ellis was born April 10, 1945. He graduated from the University of Chicago and Northwestern University School of Law. He served as a Research Assistant to Joseph Tydings, legislative policy officer for the United States Department of Housing and Urban Development and a legislative assistant to Leonard Farbstein. In 1973, he moved to Edgewater and began to work for the Cook County State's Attorney. In 1976, he was one of three individuals elected to the Illinois House of Representatives from the 12th district along with William A. Marovitz and Arthur A. Telcser. He did not run for reelection in 1978 and was succeeded by John Cullerton. In 1980, he ran again and succeeded Marovitz who successfully ran for the Illinois Senate. After the Cutback Amendment eliminated multimember districts in favor of single member districts, Levin ran in and won the 5th district. He was handily reelected five times before losing the Democratic nomination to Sara Feigenholtz.

During his legislative career, he was an active member of IVI-IPO serving as general counsel and chair for the Near North Side chapter. He was a National Executive Committee and National Board member for Americans for Democratic Action.

References

1945 births
Living people
Politicians from Chicago
University of Chicago alumni
Northwestern University Pritzker School of Law alumni
Democratic Party members of the Illinois House of Representatives
Lawyers from Chicago
20th-century American politicians
Inductees of the Chicago LGBT Hall of Fame